Francesco de Notaris (22 October 1944 – 28 October 2021) was an Italian politician. A member of The Network, he served in the Senate of the Republic from 1994 to 1996.

References

1944 births
2021 deaths
20th-century Italian politicians
21st-century Italian politicians
Senators of Legislature XII of Italy
The Network (political party) politicians
Politicians from Rome